Zilo Networks Inc. was an entertainment and marketing television network aimed at college students and young adults. The New York City-based company was founded in 1999.  Zilo Networks the created of Zilo TV, a dorm room campus cable television network, which in Spring 2009 was sold to SirkTV. SirkTV is property of New York City-based film, television and video production company Sirk Productions, a New York City-based production company founded in 1997. Sirk produces films, including the documentaries Severe Clear and Anytown, USA, and television programs, such as The Inside Reel, as well as provides multimedia services to corporate and non-profit clients.

References

External links
 sirktv.com

Entertainment companies of the United States